Polemon is a genus of rear-fanged venomous snakes in the family Atractaspididae. The genus is endemic to Africa. Fifteen species are recognized as being valid.

Miodon is a synonym. The mollusc genus of family Carditidae invalidly described by Carpenter in 1863 has been renamed Miodontiscus.

Common name
The common name of this genus is snake-eaters, for their habit of feeding mainly on smaller snakes.

Description
In the genus Polemon the maxillary is very short, with three small teeth, followed, after an interspace, by a very large, grooved fang situated anterior to the eye.  The third and fourth mandibular teeth are large and fang-like. The head is small, and not distinct from neck. The eyes are minute, with round pupils. The nostrils are in a divided nasal which does not touch the rostral, the internasal forms a suture with the first upper labial. No loreal is present. The parietal is narrowly in contact with an upper labial.

The body is cylindrical, with a very short tail. Dorsal scales are smooth, without apical pits, and are arranged in 15 rows. The ventrals are rounded; the subcaudals are single (entire), or double (divided).

Species

* Not including the nominate subspecies.

See also
 Snakebite.

References

Further reading
Jan [G] (1858). "Plan d'une Iconographie descriptive des Ophidiens et description sommaire de nouvelles espèces de Serpents ". Revue et Magasin de Zoologie Pure et Appliquée, Paris, 2e Série 10:  438-449, 514-527. (Polemon, new genus, p. 520). (in French).

Atractaspididae
Snake genera
Taxa named by Giorgio Jan